Madison Township may refer to:

Arkansas 
 Madison Township, Grant County, Arkansas, in Grant County, Arkansas
 Madison Township, Howard County, Arkansas, in Howard County, Arkansas
 Madison Township, St. Francis County, Arkansas, in St. Francis County, Arkansas

Illinois 
 Madison Township, Richland County, Illinois

Indiana 
 Madison Township, Allen County, Indiana
 Madison Township, Carroll County, Indiana
 Madison Township, Clinton County, Indiana
 Madison Township, Daviess County, Indiana
 Madison Township, Dubois County, Indiana
 Madison Township, Jay County, Indiana
 Madison Township, Jefferson County, Indiana
 Madison Township, Montgomery County, Indiana
 Madison Township, Morgan County, Indiana
 Madison Township, Pike County, Indiana
 Madison Township, Putnam County, Indiana
 Madison Township, St. Joseph County, Indiana
 Madison Township, Tipton County, Indiana
 Madison Township, Washington County, Indiana

Iowa 
 Madison Township, Buchanan County, Iowa
 Madison Township, Butler County, Iowa
 Madison Township, Clarke County, Iowa
 Madison Township, Fremont County, Iowa
 Madison Township, Hancock County, Iowa
 Madison Township, Johnson County, Iowa
 Madison Township, Jones County, Iowa
 Madison Township, Lee County, Iowa
 Madison Township, Madison County, Iowa
 Madison Township, Mahaska County, Iowa
 Madison Township, Polk County, Iowa
 Madison Township, Poweshiek County, Iowa
 Madison Township, Winneshiek County, Iowa

Kansas 
 Madison Township, Greenwood County, Kansas
 Madison Township, Lincoln County, Kansas, in Lincoln County, Kansas
 Madison Township, Riley County, Kansas, in Riley County, Kansas

Michigan 
 Madison Charter Township, Michigan, in Lenawee County

Minnesota 
 Madison Township, Lac qui Parle County, Minnesota

Missouri 
 Madison Township, Cedar County, Missouri
 Madison Township, Clark County, Missouri
 Madison Township, Grundy County, Missouri
 Madison Township, Harrison County, Missouri
 Madison Township, Johnson County, Missouri
 Madison Township, Mercer County, Missouri
 Madison Township, Jasper County, Missouri

Nebraska 
 Madison Township, Fillmore County, Nebraska

New Jersey 
 Madison Township, Middlesex County, New Jersey, now Old Bridge Township

North Carolina 
 Madison Township, Guilford County, North Carolina
 Madison Township, Rockingham County, North Carolina

North Dakota 
 Madison Township, Hettinger County, North Dakota, in Hettinger County, North Dakota

Ohio 
Madison Township, Butler County, Ohio
Madison Township, Clark County, Ohio
Madison Township, Columbiana County, Ohio
Madison Township, Fairfield County, Ohio
Madison Township, Fayette County, Ohio
Madison Township, Franklin County, Ohio
Madison Township, Guernsey County, Ohio
Madison Township, Hancock County, Ohio
Madison Township, Highland County, Ohio
Madison Township, Jackson County, Ohio
Madison Township, Lake County, Ohio
Madison Township, Licking County, Ohio
Madison Township, Montgomery County, Ohio
Madison Township, Muskingum County, Ohio
Madison Township, Perry County, Ohio
Madison Township, Pickaway County, Ohio
Madison Township, Richland County, Ohio
Madison Township, Sandusky County, Ohio
Madison Township, Scioto County, Ohio
Madison Township, Vinton County, Ohio
Madison Township, Williams County, Ohio

Pennsylvania 
 Madison Township, Armstrong County, Pennsylvania
 Madison Township, Clarion County, Pennsylvania
 Madison Township, Columbia County, Pennsylvania
 Madison Township, Lackawanna County, Pennsylvania

South Dakota 
 Madison Township, Edmunds County, South Dakota, in Edmunds County, South Dakota
 Madison Township, Grant County, South Dakota, in Grant County, South Dakota

Township name disambiguation pages